The Berry mechanism, or Berry pseudorotation mechanism, is a type of vibration causing molecules of certain geometries to isomerize by exchanging the two axial ligands (see Figure at right) for two of the equatorial ones. It is the most widely accepted mechanism for pseudorotation and most commonly occurs in trigonal bipyramidal molecules such as PF5, though it can also occur in molecules with a square pyramidal geometry.  The Berry mechanism is named after R. Stephen Berry, who first described this mechanism in 1960.

Berry mechanism in trigonal bipyramidal structure
The process of pseudorotation occurs when the two axial ligands close like a pair of scissors pushing their way in between two of the equatorial groups which scissor out to accommodate them. Both the axial and equatorial constituents move at the same rate of increasing the angle between the other axial or equatorial constituent. This forms a square based pyramid where the base is the four interchanging ligands and the tip is the pivot ligand, which has not moved. The two originally equatorial ligands then open out until they are 180 degrees apart, becoming axial groups perpendicular to where the axial groups were before the pseudorotation. This requires about 3.6 kcal/mol in PF5.

This rapid exchange of axial and equatorial ligands renders complexes with this geometry unresolvable (unlike carbon atoms with four distinct substituents), except at low temperatures or when one or more of the ligands is bi- or poly-dentate.

Berry mechanism in square pyramidal structure
The Berry mechanism in square pyramidal molecules (such as IF5) is somewhat like the inverse of the mechanism in bipyramidal molecules. Starting at the "transition phase" of bipyramidal pseudorotation, one pair of fluorines scissors back and forth with a third fluorine, causing the molecule to vibrate. Unlike with pseudorotation in bipyramidal molecules, the atoms and ligands which are not actively vibrating in the "scissor" motion are still participating in the process of pseudorotation; they make general adjustment based on the movement of the actively vibrating atoms and ligands. However, this geometry requires a significant amount of energy to occur of about 26.7 kcal/mol.

See also
 Pseudorotation
 Bailar twist
 Bartell mechanism
 Ray–Dutt twist
 Fluxional molecule

References

Molecular geometry

fr:Pseudorotation de Berry